Kharqan Rural District is a rural district (dehestan) in the Central District of Razan County, Hamadan Province, Iran. At the 2006 census, its population was 5,605, in 1,340 families. The rural district has 16 villages.

References 

Rural Districts of Hamadan Province
Razan County